Rwang Pam Township Stadium is a multi-use stadium in Jos, Nigeria. It is used mostly for football matches and is the home stadium of Jos teams Plateau UnitedB, Pepsi F.A. and Mighty Jets F.C. The stadium has a capacity of 15,000 spectators.

External links
Stadium information

Football venues in Nigeria